The Manguaba River is a river of Alagoas state in eastern Brazil. It flows into the Atlantic Ocean at Porto de Pedras.

See also
List of rivers of Alagoas

External links
Road map of Alagoas

Rivers of Alagoas